Riverside Regional High School is an English-language secondary school in the Arvida area of Saguenay, Quebec, Canada. It occupies the building of the former Saguenay Valley High School, constructed in 1962. It is operated by the Central Quebec School Board.
The school was created by the merger of Saguenay Valley High School and the high school grades of St. Patrick's School in 1997 at the time that the Quebec government replaced confessional school boards (Catholic or Protestant) with linguistic boards (French or English).

References

External links
https://www.cqsb.qc.ca/en/web/riverside-regional-high-school

High schools in Quebec
Education in Saguenay, Quebec